Hernán Vigil (29 July 1910 – 1980) was a Chilean equestrian. He competed in two events at the 1952 Summer Olympics.

References

1910 births
1980 deaths
Chilean male equestrians
Olympic equestrians of Chile
Equestrians at the 1952 Summer Olympics
Pan American Games medalists in equestrian
Pan American Games silver medalists for Chile
Pan American Games bronze medalists for Chile
Equestrians at the 1951 Pan American Games
Sportspeople from Viña del Mar
Medalists at the 1951 Pan American Games
20th-century Chilean people